A secondary school leaving qualification is a document signifying that the holder has fulfilled any secondary education requirements of their locality, often including the passage of a final qualification examination.

For each leaving certificate student, they obtain a certain number of points coinciding with the results they received in their examinations. These results will then determine the qualifications of the student; Whether they get into university or whether they have to have an alternative method into what they wish to study.

Africa

East Africa
Kenya - Kenya Certificate of Secondary Education (KCSE)
Uganda - Advanced Certificate of Education
Tanzania-Certificate of Secondary Education Examination(C.S.E.E)
Ethiopia - EGSECE: Ethiopian General Secondary Education Certificate Examination EHEECE Ethiopian Higher Education Entrance Certificate Examination

West Africa
West Africa - West African Senior School Certificate Examination (WASSCE)
Nigeria - National Examination Council (NECO)
Tunisia - Baccalauréat

Zambia general examination GCE School Certificate (a prerequisite to the HSC
South Africa - National Senior Certificate (NSC) and National Certificate (Vocational) (NCV). 
Zimbabwe - ZIMSEC GCE Advanced Level
 ZIMSEC GCE Ordinary Level, a prerequisite to the GCE Advanced Level.
Swaziland - Swaziland General Certificate of Secondary Education SGCSE

Americas

United States and Canada
United States - US schools do not typically have a leaving exam, but they do exist. For a general resource on exit exams at different levels in the US, see this page on exit examinations. Most US high schools use a High School Diploma to designate successful completion of the secondary school requirements of their locality.
New York State - Regents Diploma
Canada - Canadian High School Diploma Formerly the Canadian Diploma Certificate of Education (CDCE)
 Diplôme des études secondaires Formerly Quebec High School/Secondary Certificate and québécois baccalaureat
General Educational Development (GED) credential for non-diploma holders
Canadian high school examinations

Spanish-speaking countries
 Bachillerato is a term used in Venezuela for those having completed secondary school. Bachillerato is also used in Chile and a number of other countries. 
 In Colombia, Bachiller Técnico or Bachiller Académico are terms used for those the secondary school qualifications. 
 In the Dominican Republic, Bachiller en Ciencias Físicas y Matemáticas, Bachiller en Ciencias Físicas y Naturales, Bachiller en Filosofía y Letras, and Bachiller Técnico are high school diplomas that allow for entry to universities. 
 In Puerto Rico, the term bachillerato refers to a bachelor's or undergraduate degree, not a high school diploma.

Caribbean countries
Caribbean Secondary Education Certificate
Caribbean Advanced Proficiency Examination

Asia

East Asia
China - National Higher Education Entrance Examination
Hong Kong - Hong Kong Diploma of Secondary Education

South Asia
Bangladesh 
 Higher Secondary School Certificate (HSC) (12th grade)
 Secondary School Certificate (SSC) (10th grade)
India:
In India, education curricula is managed by multiple governing bodies state-wise as well as nation-wide.
 Under the Central Board of Secondary Education (CBSE) based in New Delhi,
All India Senior School Certificate Examination (AISSCE)(12th grade)
 All India Senior School Examination (AISSE)(10th grade)
Another such board on the national level is the **Indian Certificate of Secondary Education (ICSE) School Leaving Diploma.
The following are some of the state boards that offer a regional-focussed education. Regional boards are sometimes considered sub-par in comparison to their national level equivalents. However, there is no tangible proof of credibility of any of the ecuational boards in India.
Maharashtra State Board of Secondary and Higher Secondary Education - School Leaving Diploma offered by state government of Maharashtra.
Assam, India
Assam Higher Secondary Education Council (AHSEC) (12th grade) - 
Board of Secondary Education Assam (SEBA) (10th grade) - School Leaving Diploma offered by state government of Assam
West Bengal Council of Higher Secondary Education (WBCHSE)(12th grade)
 West Bengal Board of Secondary Education (WBSE)(10th grade)
Tamil Nadu, India - Higher Secondary Certificate  (HSC) School Leaving Diploma offered by the Tamil Nadu state Govt.
Kerala, India
 The Directorate of Higher Secondary Education (DHSE) (12th grade)
 Kerala State Education Board (KSEB) (10th grade)
Pakistan - Matric/SSC Secondary School Certificate (Localised Boards)
Nepal:
Secondary Education Examination (10th Grade)
School Leaving Certificate Examination (11th and 12th Grade)
Sri Lanka:
General Certificate of Education (GCE) O-Level
General Certificate of Education (GCE) A-level

Southeast Asia
 Brunei - Brunei-Cambridge GCE Advanced Level
 Indonesia - As of 2017, Indonesia replaced Ujian Akhir Nasional (National Final Examination) into Ujian Nasional Berbasis Komputer (National Computer-Based Examination), which uses a computer to answer the exams.
 Malaysia - Sijil Pelajaran Malaysia - Malaysian Certificate of Education or International Baccalaureate Diploma or Cambridge A Levels
 Singapore - Singapore-Cambridge GCE Advanced Level or International Baccalaureate Diploma or NUS High School of Mathematics and Science Diploma

Middle East 

 Iran - Iranian High School Diploma and Vocational School Diploma 
 Afghanistan - High school diploma
 Israel - Bagrut certificate
 Iraq - Iraqi Baccalaureate Diploma (Scientific or Art Branch) Higher Secondary School Certificate (HSC) (12th grade)

Europe

Pan-European
European Baccalaureate

National
Albania - Matura Shtetërore
Austria - Maturazeugnis
Belarus - Attestat o Srednem Obrazovanii
Belgium - CESS - Certificat d'enseignement secondaire supérieur
Bosnia and Herzegovina:
Diploma o završenoj Gimnaziji
Diploma o završenoj srednjoj školi
Svjedodžba o maturi
Svjedodžba o završnom srednjem obrazovanju
Bulgaria - Matura
Croatia
Svjedodžba o maturi
Svjedodžba o završnom srednjem obrazovanju
Czech Republic - Maturita
Estonia - Riigieksamid
Finland - Ylioppilastutkinto
France - Baccalauréat
Germany - Abitur
Greece - Απολυτήριο (Apolytirion)
Hungary - Érettségi
Iceland - Stúdentspróf
Ireland - Leaving Certificate (Árdteistiméireacht)
Italy - Maturità, granting the Diploma (qualified by the type of school: di liceo, di istituto tecnico or di istituto professionale)
Kosovo - Matura
Netherlands - Voorbereidend wetenschappelijk onderwijs (VWO)
 Hoger Algemeen Vormend Onderwijs (havo)
 Voorbereidend Middelbaar Beroepsonderwijs (VMBO)
North Macedonia - Matura
Spain - Bachillerato
 Pruebas de Acceso a Estudios Universitarios (commonly called "Selectividad") when entering university
Sweden - Gymnasieexamen
Poland - Matura
Romania - Bacalaureat
Russia - Unified State Exam
Serbia - Matura
Slovakia - Maturitné vysvedčenie
Slovenia - Matura
Switzerland - Matura
Ukraine - Matura
United Kingdom:
General Certificate of Education (GCE) A-level 
AQA Baccalaureate, a qualification earned by combining A-levels
Edexcel Diploma, a qualification earned by combining A-levels
General Certificate of Secondary Education (GCSE), a prerequisite to the A-levels
BTEC Extended Diploma
Access to HE Diploma
Cambridge Pre-U Diploma
 Historical:
 School Certificate (England and Wales) (SC)
 Higher School Certificate (England and Wales) (HSC)
 GCE Ordinary Level (O-Level)
 Certificate of Secondary Education (CSE)
Regional:
England, Wales, and Northern Ireland - 14–19 Diploma
Wales - Welsh Baccalaureate
Scotland - National 5 Scottish Higher and Advanced Higher

Oceania
Australia:
Higher School Certificate
Victorian Certificate of Education/Victorian Certificate of Applied Learning
Queensland Certificate of Education
South Australian Certificate of Education
Western Australian Certificate of Education
Tasmanian Certificate of Education
Australian Capital Territory Year 12 Certificate
Northern Territory Certificate of Education
New Zealand - National Certificate of Educational Achievement (NCEA)

International
International Baccalaureate Diploma (IB Diploma)
Advanced Placement International Diploma (APID)
Advanced International Certificate of Education (AICE)
International General Certificate of Secondary Education (IGCSE), a prerequisite to the AICE

See also
List of primary and secondary school tests
List of admission tests to colleges and universities

References

School examinations

 
Leaving qualifications